Lamor M. Whitehead (born 1978) is an American bishop and convicted felon, known also for his close relationship with New York City Mayor Eric Adams and his ostentatious displays of wealth.

Early life and education 
Whitehead was born in 1978. He claims he is the son of Arthur Miller, Jr. who died in police custody following a traffic stop, however Arthur Miller Jr. only has one son (who was 12 years old when his father was murdered) according to his surviving family’s website. At the time of his death, Arthur had 4 children ages 8-16. 
Following high school, Whitehead secured athletic scholarship offers from Shaw University and Farmingdale University before studying accounting and videography at Eastern New Mexico University. Following his return to New York, he began a career as a mortgage broker.

Whitehead later studied at New York Theological Seminary. He completed his studies with a Ministry in Human Services certificate from the Theological Institution of Rising Hope Inc., which is accredited through Nyack College. He is a licensed New York State Chaplain and a certified marriage and funeral officiant.

Loan default, arrest, and conviction for identity theft 
In 2004, Suffolk County, New York police received complaints from nine residents claiming that their identities were being used to purchase Range Rover cars. After arresting one suspect, the newly formed Identity Theft Investigation Unit began to pursue Whitehead, who had shared the same address as the first suspect.

The following year, Whitehead took a $200,000 personal loan from conductor Maximo Bragado-Darman and his son, Julio Bragado-Young. According to a lawsuit, Whitehead promised to repay the loan in one month along with $25,000. Whitehead defaulted and Bragado-Darman successfully sued Whitehead in 2008 for $306,000.  As of 2022, Whitehead continues to owe Bragado-Daman $261,000 following a court judgement.

Later in 2005, Whitehead was living in Teaneck, New Jersey. Following a criminal complaint, he was arrested by Port Authority Police in Upper Manhattan while driving a maroon Range Rover. Following the arrest, police discovered that Whitehead was operating an extensive fraud and identity theft operation to take out more than $2 million in loans and purchase motor vehicles. More than 50 victims were identified from states including Tennessee, Georgia, and New York. Whitehead was charged with multiple counts of identity theft and convicted in 2008. He served five years in Sing Sing Correctional Facility before being released in 2013.

Whitehead filed for personal bankruptcy in 2006.

2021 fraud lawsuit 
In 2021, Whitehead was sued in New York by a former congregant who claimed he defrauded her of $90,000. According to the complaint, in November 2020, Whitehead promised to assist Pauline Anderson in improving her credit score as well as purchasing and renovating a house in exchange for a $90,000 investment. Whitehead further promised to repay Anderson in full as well as $100 each month until the property was fully renovated. Further, Anderson claims in the complaint that in May 2021, Whitehead texted her and said the $90,000 was not an “investment”, but rather a “campaign contribution” that Whitehead was under no obligation to repay.

Whitehead has denied all claims and the matter remains in court.

2022 robbery and aftermath 
Whitehead and his wife were robbed at gunpoint in July 2022. Thieves allegedly stole $1 million worth of jewelry, which Whitehead alleged to have included a Cuban link chain valued at $399,000 and a Rolex watch valued at $75,000. The event took place while Whitehead was leading services at his Leaders of Tomorrow International Church in Brooklyn and was streamed live. In September that year, two men were arrested and charged with the robbery. The suspects were also charged with conspiracy and possession of firearms.

Following the robbery, Whitehead sued a local radio host for $50 million, claiming that the host defamed him during her program while making comments about the robbery.

Leaders of Tomorrow International Churches 
Whitehead founded the Leaders of Tomorrow International Churches in March 2014.

Friendship with Eric Adams and political aspirations 
Adams and Whitehead struck up a friendship that goes back to 2013. While Adams was Brooklyn Borough President, Whitehead appeared by his side at numerous high-profile events beginning in 2016. During Adams' campaign for Borough President, Whitehead falsely claimed that he had created a collaborative justice initiative with the Brooklyn District Attorney. In August 2013, Adams introduced Whitehead at a concert, calling the pastor “my good friend and good brother.” Adams presented Whitehead’s mother with an honorary citation in 2015 and gave a key to Brooklyn to Foxy Brown in February 2016.

Whitehead ran for Brooklyn Borough President in 2021.

In 2022, Whitehead was thought to have worked with Adams to arrange the surrender of man suspected of shooting another rider on the subway. Whitehead arrived up for the surrender at a Manhattan police precinct driving a grey Rolls-Royce.

Personal life 
Whitehead became well known for his ostentatious displays of wealth in his relatively modest neighborhood of Canarsie. In addition to owning a large wardrobe, Whitehead has been known to drive around New York in a Rolls-Royce.

Along with his conviction for identity theft, Whitehead was arrested twice in 2015 on claims of child abuse and violating an order of protection. Charges in all cases were dismissed.

Whitehead’s cousin is rapper Foxy Brown.

Whitehead is married to Asia DosReis-Whitehead and has three children.

In April 2015, Asia DoeReis-Whitehead was diagnosed with Guillain-Barre syndrome and was hospitalized for many months. Following her recovery, she formed the nonprofit UaReACHAMPION Empowerment Network.

Real estate holdings 
Whitehead owns a mansion in Paramus, New Jersey. The home is 9,000 square feet with six bedrooms and seven bathrooms. Whitehead purchased the home in 2019 for $1.64 million and put it on the market in 2022 for $2.99 million, making it the most expensive listing in the town at the time.

In 2021, Whitehead, through his company Whitehead Estates LLC, completed the purchase of a series of apartments in Hartford, Connecticut. He took out a mortgage of $4.15 million for the purchase and borrowed an additional amount in February 2022, raising the total debt to $4.5 million.

References 

1978 births
Living people
Prosperity theologians
American Pentecostal pastors
African-American Christian clergy
Inmates of Sing Sing
Criminals from Brooklyn
People from Canarsie, Brooklyn
People from Brooklyn